Seabury may refer to:
Seabury, Dublin
Seabury (name)
Seabury-Western Theological Seminary
Seabury Commission, a commission investigating corruption in New York City in 1930-32
Seabury Hall, a college preparatory high school in Hawaii
Bishop Seabury Academy, a college preparatory high school in Kansas
Merchant's House Museum or Seabury Tredwell House, in the Bowery, Manhattan
Charles L. Seabury Company, a former New York shipyard